The Massachusetts Coastal Railroad  is a Class III railroad serving south-eastern Massachusetts. The railroad maintains track from Hyannis to Framingham, with the railroad operating its own trains on the 97 miles of lines between Hyannis and Fall River/New Bedford. The railroad is the successor operator of portions of the Bay Colony Railroad.

History
On December 31, 2007, the contract to operate the freight railroad lines owned by the Commonwealth of Massachusetts administered by the Executive Office of Transportation (EOT) expired.  These railroad lines included the Cape Main Line, as well as several shorter lines both on Cape Cod and in Southeastern Massachusetts.  The new contract was awarded to a new company, the Massachusetts Coastal Railroad, which took over on January 1, 2008.  At that time, the Bay Colony ceased operations on those lines, but continues to operate in other areas of the Commonwealth, including on the Watuppa Branch in Dartmouth and Westport, and the Millis Branch in Millis.

The Massachusetts Coastal Railroad is headquartered in Lakeville, Massachusetts.

Operations

The railroad operates the "trash train" hauling refuse from the Upper Cape Regional Transfer Station in Falmouth and the Yarmouth-Barnstable Regional Transfer Station in Yarmouth to the Southeastern Massachusetts Resource Recovery Facility, a waste-to-energy plant in Rochester, MA, as did its predecessor. The operations occur entirely along the Cape Main Line, including the spur to Falmouth. However, Massachusetts Coastal operates the train under the new name, "Energy Train" using 20 former Canadian Pacific bath tub coal hopper cars rebuilt into "Energy" cars. These "Energy Cars" are numbered 1000–1019. These cars are painted in a Pullman green scheme with a black band. The first 6 cars were fully painted with "MASS COASTAL" lettering, and "ENERGY TRAIN" written along the sides and gold stripes. The remaining 14 cars are in an abbreviated scheme with no lettering or stripes. This was done to speed up the delivery process. As of January 2015, the Energy Train operates Monday through Friday in the morning and afternoon.

In addition to the energy train, Mass Coastal offers general freight transport for companies based on Cape Cod and the south coast, specifically along the Cape Main, Middleboro Secondary, New Bedford Subdivision, Fall River Secondary, and the Dean Street Industrial Track (the latter of which is located in Taunton). Interchanges are done with CSX in Middleboro several times a week, to allow for long-distance shipping to and from the region. Operations in Fall River, New Bedford, and Taunton can be seen some days Monday through Friday.

Mass Coastal does not operate freight trains on Sundays or holidays unless needed.

The Cape Cod Central Railroad is owned by the same parent company, and operates passenger trains as a heritage railroad.  A plan to start "Mass Coastal" commuter rail service between Middleborough and Buzzards Bay or Sandwich in 2010 has not been implemented as of 2023, but the seasonal CapeFLYER train started running to Hyannis in summer 2013.

In 2012, Chicago-based Iowa Pacific Holdings acquired Cape Rail, Inc and its subsidiaries Mass Coastal and Cape Cod Central.

Mass Coastal took over CSX tracks from Taunton, MA to Fall River and New Bedford, MA. The railroad continues to operate track south from the connection with CSX at Cotley Junction in Taunton to both New Bedford and Fall River.

Rolling stock

Mass Coastal operates with five locomotives; numbered 2006 through 2010. The 2006 is an ex-ATSF GP7u (previously BNSF 1336), the 2007 is a similar ex-ATSF GP9u (previously BNSF 1664), the 2008 is an ex-Canadian National GP9RM and the 2009 is an ex IC GP28. All Mass Coastal locomotives rotate jobs throughout the year. Usually, 1 locomotive handles the Energy Train, 2 handle the Cape Cod Central tourist trains, and the 2 others handle the Fall River and New Bedford Lines. All MC units are to eventually be equipped with cab signals, enabling them to traverse the CSX interchange in Middleborough, MA. As of September 2015, 2008 and 2009 are so equipped.  All of the locomotives are painted in an attractive Cranberry Red scheme with a black band and yellow stripes and lettering. The two exceptions to the paint scheme are engines 2006 and 2007. After a main generator failure in early 2009, the 2007 re-emerged with a new generator and yellow safety stripes on the front pilots. Soon after, this the unit was transferred to Taunton. It replaced 2006 which came to Hyannis and had the yellow stripes painted on both the front and rear plow. In 2009, a fourth engine was acquired numbered 2009; A GP28 built by EMD in 1964 for the Illinois Central Railroad. This engine was purchased from National Rail Equipment in Silvis, Illinois. In late 2010, the railroad purchased their fifth locomotive, a GP50 #2010. This engine is a former Chicago North Western unit.

Mass Coastal recently purchased two former New Haven Railroad FL-9s that were owned and modified (as FL9M's) by the State of Connecticut DOT. These were among the 6 that ConnDOT had retired around 2009 and had been for sale for a few years. ConnDOT finally auctioned them off and Mass Coastal was the high bidder for units number 2011 (Former New Haven Railroad #2038) and number 2026 (Former New Haven Railroad #2007). Both units are now (as of May 2019) in service on Cape Cod Central Excursion trains.

References

External links

Massachusetts Coastal Railroad official website

Massachusetts railroads
2007 establishments in Massachusetts